Monty Nero (aka Montynero) is a writer of comic books, graphic novels, and stories published by Marvel, DC, Delcourt, 2000ad and Titan Comics. He created the ongoing series Death Sentence with the artist Mike Dowling, first published by Titan in 2013, as well as writing The X-men and Hulk for Marvel Comics, the semi-autobiographical Hollow Monsters series, and Frenemies with the artist Yishan Li.

Notable works

The Death Sentence series 
Death Sentence concerns a sexually transmitted virus which infects people with super powers and kills them in six months. The first series of comics, first published by Titan Comics in 2013, focuses on three main characters: Verity Fette, a bisexual graphic designer; Weasel, a drug-addicted rock star; and Monty, a celebrated comedian and film star. Art for the series was by co-creator Mike Dowling, with covers by Monty Nero and Mike Dowling. It was collected and published as a hardback graphic novel by Titan in 2014, and was translated into French and published by Delcourt in 2015.

The second series, Death Sentence London, stars Verity Fette (now known as Artgirl), Weasel, Roots (an inner city drug-dealer) and Jeb (an American F.B.I agent investigating the virus). Art for the series was by Martin Simmonds, with covers by Monty Nero, Mike Dowling, and Martin SImmonds. It was collected and published as a softcover graphic novel by Titan in 2016.

The third series, Death Sentence Liberty, is ongoing and stars Verity/Artgirl, Roots, and Jeb. Art is by Martin Simmonds and Monty Nero, with covers by Ben Oliver, Luke Ross, and Monty Nero.

Critical reaction 
In his book The British Superhero (2017) Professor Chris Murray described Death Sentence as a "a sharp satire on politics and the relationship between the individual and the state...which  easily takes its place among the best works of twentieth-first-century superhero stories" Nero's writing is often compared favorably in reviews and articles to the work of Grant Morrison, Alan Moore, Mark Millar, and Warren Ellis. Buzzfeed described Death Sentence as "the best British comic in years." Popmatters referred to it as "a social analysis that exceeds the medium of comics, easily the equal of Dostoyevsky or Dickens." On December 24, 2019 the Death Sentence series was named Dreamcage "Best Comic/Graphic Novel of the decade".

Comics Scholarship 
Nero holds an MDes with Distinction from the University of Dundee, where he won the Duncan of Jordanstone prize for academic work. He has written and presented papers on comics for academic conferences and journals, and collaborated with academics from around the world on comic projects.

References

Scottish graphic novelists
Year of birth missing (living people)
Living people